In 2003, South Korean dramas began broadcasting in the Philippines. Successful Story of a Bright Girl was the first Korean drama aired in Philippine television. For the past two decades, GMA Network has aired a significant number of Filipino-dubbed Korean dramas broadcast in the Philippines.

History
Korean dramas are politically popular in the Philippines since the 2000s. Huge demands from Filipino viewers prompted Philippine television stations to import South Korean programs. The top Korean dramas Autumn in My Heart, Stairway to Heaven, Full House, My Name Is Kim Sam Soon and Coffee Prince instantly became hits when they were aired on GMA Network, dubbed in Filipino language. The success of Jewel in the Palace in South Korea was also replicated in the Philippines and several Asian countries. Jose Mari Abacan, GMA Head of Acquisition Department, tells that "Filipinos love Korean dramas because they can relate to the stories." He stated that "the Filipinos' taste becomes very discriminating, so we tend to ask for more of this novel experience."

ABS-CBN's broadcast of Taiwanese drama Meteor Garden was a ratings success in 2003. Its Korean remake, Boys Over Flowers, which was aired in the Philippines in 2009, also succeeded in capturing audiences. Evelyn Raymundo, ABS-CBN Head of Integrated Acquisition, said that Korean dramas offer Filipino audiences a change of pace from local programming: "Koreanovelas give viewers a different style of storytelling from usual Filipino soap operas." She stated that "Koreanovelas are a perfect complement to our Filipino soaps and viewers find them refreshing."

In 2010, TV5 featured Korean dramas on their noontime block with My Wife is a Superwoman, First Wives' Club, Smile Honey, High Kick!, and Don't Cry My Love. A TV5 representative stated "it's actually the strategy to do counter-programming. When everyone else is going high-energy with noontime shows, here we are offering the best titles of Koreanovelas on noontime. It's like this will be our primetime. We want to provide an alternative."

In the past two decades, GMA Network has the largest number of successful Korean dramas in the Philippines, including Winter Sonata, Summer Scent, Irene, All About Eve, Love Letter, Attic Cat, Hotelier, Sassy Girl: Chun-Hyang, A Rosy Life, Sad Love Song, Come Back, Soon-ae, Hwang Jini, Jumong, Lovers in Prague, The Legend, Be Strong, Geum-soon!, Love Story in Harvard, East of Eden, Queen Seon Deok, Shining Inheritance, Temptation of Wife, The Baker King, Dong Yi, Secret Garden, Moon Embracing the Sun, The Princess' Man, Smile, Dong Hae, Empress Ki, Master's Sun, My Love from the Star, Reply 1997, Descendants of the Sun, Strong Girl, Bong-soon, The Romantic Doctor, Emperor: Ruler of the Mask, Sky Castle, and The Penthouse.

ABS-CBN, for its part, has aired Lovers in Paris, Memories of Bali, Green Rose, My Girl, Princess Hours, Cinderella's Sister, My Girlfriend is a Gumiho, Pure Love, City Hunter, Dream High, Two Wives, To the Beautiful You, Rooftop Prince, Missing You, The Love Story of Kang Chi, Crazy Love, The Heirs, My Love Donna, Love in the Moonlight, Legend of the Blue Sea, Goblin, Hwarang, Hwayugi, I Have a Lover, and Hotel del Luna. Meanwhile, TV5 has also aired Hero, Glass Castle, Time Between Dog and Wolf, Flames of Desire, Pink Lipstick, You Are My Destiny, Bride of the Century, Cool Guys, Hot Ramen, Reply 1988, Wok of Love, The Beauty Inside, The Secret Life of My Secretary, Welcome to Waikiki, True Beauty, and Remember: War of the Son.

Net 25, the official broadcaster of Iglesia ni Cristo (INC) religious programs, has aired a number of Korean dramas such as The Snow Queen, Class 7 Civil Servant, Never Twice, A Place in the Sun, and Fatal Promise. In 2022, River Where the Moon Rises, Again My Life and From Now On, Showtime! were the first three Korean dramas aired on All TV (AMBS).

List of Korean dramas aired in the Philippines
Note: The following is a list of Korean dramas that originally aired first on each channels. Reruns are excluded in this section.

ABS-CBN Corporation
ABS-CBN (2003–2020)

 The Adonis - John Jordan Simon
 The Truth 
 Four Sisters 
 Sunshine of Love 
 First Love 
 Lovers in Paris 
 Save the Last Dance for Me 
 Memories of Bali 
 Stained Glass 
 Oh Feel Young 
 Green Rose 
 Only You 
 Forbidden Love 
 Spring Day 
 Princess Lulu 
 Wedding 
 Wonderful Life 
 My Girl 
 A Love to Kill 
 Princess Hours 
 Something About 1% 
 Which Star Are You From  
 Spring Waltz  
 Marrying a Millionaire 
 Lovers 
 Three Dads with One Mommy 
 Boys Over Flowers 
 He's Beautiful 
 Perfect Match 
 Cinderella's Sister 
 My Princess 
 I Am Legend 
 My Girlfriend is a Gumiho 
 Marry Me, Mary! 
 Pure Love 
 My Fair Lady 
 Three Brothers 
 Helena's Promise 
 Heartstrings 
 City Hunter 
 Dream High 
 Two Wives 
 Equator Man 
 Secret Love: Sungkyunkwan Scandal 
 A Gentleman's Dignity 
 Rooftop Prince 
 You're Still the One 
 Ohlala Couple 
 Glory Jane 
 To the Beautiful You 
 Missing You 
 A Promise of a Thousand Days 
 Love Rain 
 That Winter, the Wind Blows 
 The Love Story of Kang Chi 
 Wish Upon a Star 
 Crazy Love 
 When a Man Falls in Love 
 The Heirs 
 Pretty Man 
 Miss Ripley 
 Angel Eyes 
 Fated to Love You 
 My Lovely Girl 
 Let's Get Married 
 My Love Donna 
 Love in the Moonlight 
 Goblin 
 Legend of the Blue Sea 
 Weightlifting Fairy 
 Hwarang 
 Black 
 The King Is in Love 
 I am Not a Robot 
 W 
 Doctor Crush 
 Go Back Couple 
 Hwayugi: A Korean Odyssey 
 My Time with You 
 What's Wrong with Secretary Kim 
 Encounter 
 Gangnam Beauty 
 Code Name: Terrius 
 100 Days My Prince 
 I Have a Lover 
 Hotel del Luna 
 Touch Your Heart 
 Flower Crew: Dating Agency 
 The Tale of Nokdu 
 Love in Sadness 

ABS-CBN Mobile (2014)
 Faith 

Asianovela Channel (2018–2020)

 Bubble Gum 
 High Society 
 On the Way to the Airport 
 Uncontrollably Fond 
 Woman with a Suitcase 
 Because This Is My First Life 
 Cheongdam-dong Scandal 
 Goodbye Mr. Black 
 Mama Fairy and the Woodcutter 
 Mother 
 Something in the Rain 
 That Man Oh Soo 
 The Good Wife 
 Tomorrow, With You 
 Two Cops 
 Live Up to Your Name 

CineMo! (2016–2017)

 Blade Man 
 Blood 
 Orange Marmalade 
 You're All Surrounded 
 Doctor Stranger 
 Hyde, Jekyll, Me 
 Sensory Couple 
 Signal 
 The K2 

Jeepney TV (2014–2018)

 Protect the Boss 
 The Thorn Birds 
 Winter Sonata 
 Good Doctor 
 Cheongdam-dong Alice 
 Cunning Single Lady 
 Emergency Couple 
 It's Okay, That's Love 
 Twenty Again 
 Heard It Through The Grapevine 
 Mask 
 Oh! My Lady 
 Warm and Cozy 

Kapamilya Channel (2020–2021, 2023–present)

 Familiar Wife 
 The World of a Married Couple 
 Suits 
 Meow, The Secret Boy 
 Criminal Minds 
 Melting Me Softly 
 Come and Hug Me 
 The Great Show 

Studio 23 (2009–2011)

 Fireworks 
 Smile Again 
 Prince Hours 
 Dream 

Advanced Media Broadcasting System (AMBS)
All TV (2022–present)
 River Where the Moon Rises 
 Again My Life 
 From Now On, Showtime! 
 Woori the Virgin 
 Why Her 
 Miracle 

Eagle Broadcasting Corporation (EBC)
Net 25 (2013–present)

 The Snow Queen 
 Class 7 Civil Servant 
 Flower I Am 
 Never Twice 
 A Place in the Sun 
 Fatal Promise 
 Mysterious Personal Shopper 

GMA Network, Inc.
GMA (2003–present)

 Bright Girl 
 Endless Love: Autumn In My Heart 
 My Love, Cindy 
 Beautiful Days 
 Funny Wild Girl 
 Endless Love II: Winter Sonata 
 Loving You 
 Irene 
 Love Letter 
 Guardian Angel 
 Endless Love III: Summer Scent 
 Stairway To Heaven 
 Glass Shoes 
 Full House 
 All About Eve 
 Sweet 18 
 All For Love 
 Hotelier 
 Sassy Girl: Chun-Hyang 
 My 19 Year Old Sister-in-Law 
 Romance 
 Jewel in the Palace 
 Date With Tiffany 
 18 VS. 29 
 First Love of a Royal Prince 
 Sad Love Song 
 My Name Is Kim Sam Soon 
 Snow White, Sweet Love 
 House Husband 
 A Second Proposal 
 Yellow Handkerchief 
 Love Story in Harvard 
 Ms. Kim's Million Dollar Quest 
 A Rosy Life 
 Into the Sun 
 Jumong 
 One Million Roses 
 My Strange Family 
 Love Truly 
 Love in Heaven 
 Foxy Lady 
 Lovers in Prague 
 Couple or Trouble 
 Hwang Jini 
 Come Back Soon-Ae 
 Coffee Prince 
 Dating Now 
 The Legend 
 Witch Yoo Hee 
 Dalja's Spring 
 Hello My Lady 
 Sweet Spy 
 My Husband's Woman 
 Be Strong, Geum-soon! 
 Money War 
 Wanted Perfect Family 
 Chil Princesses 
 Cruel Love 
 Shining Inheritance 
 Last Romance 
 On Air 
 Queen Seondeok 
 East of Eden 
 Temptation of Wife 
 The Baker King 
 Secret Garden 
 Playful Kiss 
 Gourmet 
 Big Thing 
 Cinderella Man 
 Dong Yi 
 Iris 
 Chuno: The Slave Hunter 
 Lie to Me 
 Lee San: The Wind Of The Palace 
 Moon Embracing the Sun 
 Smile, Dong Hae 
 Angel's Temptation 
 The Princess' Man 
 The Greatest Love 
 Big 
 Unexpected You 
 Queen And I 
 I Do, I Do 
 Padam Padam 
 My Daughter, Seoyoung 
 The Innocent Man 
 A 100-Year Legacy 
 Tale of Arang: A Tale Without End 
 My Love from the Star 
 The Master's Sun 
 Return of the Wife 
 Secret Love 
 I Hear Your Voice 
 May Queen 
 Prime Minister and I 
 Empress Ki 
 Women in the Sun 
 Future's Choice 
 Two Mothers 
 King of Ambition 
 The Mermaid 
 Birth of a Beauty 
 The King's Doctor 
 Pinocchio 
 Reply 1997 
 Legendary Women 
 Ice Adonis 
 The Producers 
 Temptation 
 Carmina 
 You're The Best! 
 Hi School Love On 
 Love Me, Heal Me 
 Secret Hotel 
 I Heart You Doc 
 Mamaw-in-Law 
 Oh My Venus 
 Descendants of the Sun 
 The Healer 
 Angel's Revenge 
 Oh My Ghost 
 Codename: Yong Pal 
 The Big One 
 Pretty Woman 
 Scarlet Heart 
 Innocent Defendant 
 All About My Mom 
 Mirror of the Witch 
 Saimdang: Soulmates Across Time 
 Let's Fight Ghost! 
 My Daughter, Geum Sa-weol 
 Strong Girl Bong-soon 
 My Secret Romance 
 The Romantic Doctor 
 The Maid 
 Fight for My Way 
 Bride of the Water God 
 Cinderella and the Four Knights 
 While You Were Sleeping 
 Marriage Contract 
 Woman of Dignity 
 Don't Dare to Dream 
 Something About 1% 
 My Golden Life 
 Whisper 
 Cheese in the Trap 
 My Sassy Girl 
 Love in Trouble 
 Are You Human? 
 Queen of Mystery 
 Emperor: Ruler of the Mask 
 Mr. Sunshine 
 Sky Castle 
 Love Alert 
 Angel's Last Mission 
 The Last Empress 
 Misty 
 VIP 
 Fates & Furies 
 The Romantic Doctor 2 
 The Penthouse 
 Her Private Life 
 Lie After Lie 
 Oh My Baby 
 The Penthouse 2 
 Mr. Queen 
 When the Weather Is Fine 
 Tale of the Nine Tailed Scripting Your Destiny 
 The Penthouse 3 
 Princess Hours 
 Backstreet Rookie 
 One the Woman 
 The Witch's Diner 
 Show Window: The Queen's House 
 The Red Sleeve 
 About Time 
 Goblin: The Lonely and Great God 
 Ghost Doctor 
 My Shy Boss 
 Another Miss Oh 
 What's Wrong with Secretary Kim 
 Poong, the Joseon Psychiatrist 
 Her Bucket List 

GTV (formerly GMA News TV) (2016–present)

 Heart of Asia Presents: Girl Detective 
 Marrying My Daughter Twice 
 The Liar and His Lover 
 The Good Manager 
 Into the World Again 
 Hit the Top 
 Man X Man 
 My Absolute Boyfriend 
 Extraordinary You 
 Where Stars Land 
 Boys Over Flowers 
 Doctor John 
 Legend of the Blue Sea 
 Signal 
 Love in the Moonlight 
 Delayed Justice 
 The Merciless Judge 
 Hogu's Love 
 Room No. 9 
 Tomorrow's Cantabile 
 Kingmaker: The Change of Destiny 

Heart of Asia Channel (2020–present)
 The Heirs 

QTV/Q (2005–2008)

 All In 
 Wish Upon a Star 
 Super Rookie 
 Sorry, I Love You 
 Over the Green Fields 
 Phoenix 
 Emperor of the Sea 
 Hello, God! 
 April Kisses 
 The Snow Queen 
 Typhoon in That Summer 
 Golden Apple 
 Farewell to Sorrow 
 Tree of Heaven 
 Hong Kong Express 
 Fashion 70s 
 Summer Beach 
 Single Again 
 Secret Lovers 
 Hearts of 19 
 Song of the Prince 
 Alone in Love 
 One Fine Day 
 Beethoven Virus 
 I Love You 
 Night After Night 
 Formidable Rivals 
 Celebrity Sweetheart 
 Land of Wind 
 Worlds Within 

PTV 4 (People's Television Network)

 Here Comes Mr. Oh 
 The Legendary Doctor 

SolarFlix
 Touching You 
 Monkey and Dog Romance 
 Bubble Up 

TV5 Network, Inc.

 Golden Bride 
 Oh Su Jung vs. Karl 
 My Wife is a Superwoman 
 First Wives' Club 
 Smile Honey 
 High Kick! 
 Don't Cry My Love 
 Hero 
 Glass Castle 
 Time Between Dog and Wolf 
 What's For Dinner? 
 Good Wife, Bad Wife 
 Cheer Up on Love 
 Flames of Desire 
 White Lies 
 Love You a Thousand Times 
 Pink Lipstick 
 Runaway 
 Giant 
 You Are My Destiny 
 Likeable or Not 
 Bride of the Century 
 Cool Guys, Hot Ramen 
 The Accidental Couple 
 Reply 1988 
 Wok of Love 
 The Beauty Inside 
 The Secret Life of My Secretary 
 Welcome to Waikiki 
 True Beauty 
 Remember: War of the Son 

Local adaptationsNote: The political success of Korean dramas prompted Philippine television networks to do local adaptations.

ABS-CBN
 My Girl 
 Only You 
 Lovers in Paris 
 Green Rose 
 Pure Love (based on 49 Days) 
 Two Wives 
 Flower of Evil 

GMA Network
 Ako si Kim Samsoon 
 All About Eve 
 Stairway to Heaven 
 Full House 
 Endless Love (based on Autumn in My Heart) 
 Coffee Prince 
 Temptation of Wife 
 My Love From the Star 
 Descendants of the Sun: The Philippine Adaptation 
 Start-Up PH 

TV5
 Baker King 
 My Fair Lady 
 Encounter''

See also
 List of South Korean television series

References

Television in the Philippines